Molyatichi (variants Malyatsichy and Maliatichi) (Łacinka: Maliacičy) is a village in the Krychaw District of the Mogilev Region in Belarus. In 2010, it had a population of 350 residents.

History

 
In 1708, the village was the location of the Battle of Malatitze during the Great Northern War.

Before World War II, it was a shtetl. Nazi Germany units occupied the city from 1941 to 1944.

In November 1941, between 70 and 122 Jews were killed in Molyatichi. The Jews were shot with a bullet in the back. Some children were thrown alive in the grave. There were nine shooters: six Germans and three local policemen. One week after the shooting, the Germans organized an auction to sell the Jews' belongings.

References

External links

 
 Molyatichi page at Belarus Globe website
 Molyatichi page at website of Belarus Geocenter

Villages in Belarus
Populated places in Mogilev Region
Krychaw District
Mstislaw Voivodeship
Cherikovsky Uyezd
Shtetls
Jewish Belarusian history
Holocaust locations in Belarus